IL-20 or IL 20 may refer to:

 Interleukin 20, a protein in humans
 Illinois's 20th congressional district, an obsolete district
 Illinois Route 20
 Ilyushin Il-20 (1948), a prototype Soviet ground attack aircraft
 Ilyushin Il-20M, a military variant of the Soviet-era Il-18 turboprop aircraft